Ceryx albipuncta is a moth of the subfamily Arctiinae. It was described by George Hampson in 1907. It is found on Luzon in the Philippines.

References

Ceryx (moth)
Moths described in 1907